Sulfotransferase 4A1 is an enzyme that in humans is encoded by the SULT4A1 gene.

This gene encodes a member of the sulfotransferase family. The encoded protein is a brain-specific sulfotransferase believed to be involved in the metabolism of neurotransmitters. Polymorphisms in this gene may be associated with susceptibility to schizophrenia.

References

Further reading